The 2005 NACAC Combined Events Championships were held in San Juan, Puerto Rico, at the Estadio Sixto Escobar on May 28–29, 2005. 
A detailed report on the event and an appraisal of the results was given.

Complete results were published.

Medallists

Results

Men's Decathlon
Key

Women's Heptathlon
Key

Participation
An unofficial count yields the participation of 28 athletes from 9 countries.  Obviously, the event was also open for athletes from CACAC member nations that are non-NACAC members (Colombia and Venezuela).

 (4)
 (3)
 (1)
 (1)
 (3)
 (3)
 (6)
 (6)
 (1)

See also
 2005 in athletics (track and field)

References

Pan American Combined Events Cup
NACAC Combined Events Championships
International athletics competitions hosted by Puerto Rico
NACAC Combined Events Championships